Baharestan Metro Station is a station on Isfahan Metro Line 1. The station started operation on 2 November 2016. It is located at Baharestan Boulevard in northern Isfahan. The next station on the west side is Qods Station and on the east side Golestan Station having a similar status as yet unopened.

References

Isfahan Metro stations
Railway stations opened in 2016